Makani may refer to:

People 

Makani is a surname. Notable people with the surname include:

Julie Makani (born 1970), Tanzanian medical researcher
Lévy Makani, Congolese politician
Ramo Makani (born 1960), Tanzanian politician
Sosha Makani (born 1986), Iranian footballer
Firdaws Makani (1483 — 1530), posthumous name of Emperor Babur, founder of Mughal Empire
Mariam Makani (1527 — 1604), consort of Emperor Humayun and mother of Emperor Akbar
Jannat Makani (1569 — 1627), posthumous name of Mughal Emperor Jahangir. 
Bilqis Makani (1573 — 1619), posthumous name of the consort of Emperor Jahangir and mother of Emperor Shah Jahan
Khuld Makani (1618 — 1707), posthumous name of Mughal Emperor Alamgir (Aurangzeb) 
Hiren Makani (1990), Well-known Public Servant in Gujarat Government.

Organizations 

Makani (company), a wind-based energy company that is a subsidiary of Alphabet Inc.